Walter Tropenell was an English politician who was MP for Lyme Regis in October 1377, 1379, 1385, 1386, February 1388, September 1388, January 1390, and 1391.

References

14th-century births
Members of the Parliament of England (pre-1707) for Lyme Regis
English MPs October 1377
English MPs 1379
English MPs 1385
English MPs 1386
English MPs February 1388
English MPs September 1388
English MPs January 1390
English MPs 1391